Sonadanga is an Upazila of Khulna District in the Division of Khulna, Bangladesh.

Geography
It has 23778 households and total area 8.42 km2.

Demographics
In the 1991 Bangladesh census, Sonadanga had a population of 128,330. Males constituted 52.64% of the population, and females 47.36%. The population older than 18 was 70354. Sonadanga had an average literacy rate of 60.6% (7+ years), lower than the national average of 32.4%.

, the population was 167,739.

Most of the Sonadanga inhabitants are local who are living here for generations. There are also a number of people who comes from other part of the country. Most of them are from other parts of Khulna division. The inhabitants are mostly Muslim. There is a Christian missionary located in Sonadanga. A noticeable number of Christian people live around that missionary  which made Sonadanga one of the most Christian populated area. in Khulna City.

Places 
The most noticeable place of Sonadanga is the Bus terminal. That is the busiest bus terminal in Khulna division where they operate a large number of buses that travel between various districts in Bangladesh. The second noticeable place is the "New Market", a market which is more than 50 years old and still called "new". There is a Christian missionary in Shonadanga that is famous for various charitable activities specially for almost free medical treatment offered by foreign doctors. The missionary have two Churches, and one school named "St. Johns School". There is a Mosque complex (Baitun Noor) where they have a large Mosque building with a market in the ground floor. There is a modern supermarket named "Safe & Save" just opposite to "New market. Sonadanga residential area is a huge residential project by KDA (Khulna Development Authority) an autonomous body. That residential aria have a few schools in it. The oldest school in that area is "Khulna Collegiate School". There is also a newly established Private University in Sonadanga (North Western University, Khulna). City Inn, is the only three star hotel located in Sonadanga.

Administration
Sonadanga has 6 Unions/Wards, 31 Mauzas/Mahallas, and 0 villages.

See also
 Upazilas of Bangladesh
 Districts of Bangladesh
 Divisions of Bangladesh

References

Upazilas of Khulna District